Metohija is a region in the southwestern part of Kosovo.

Metohija may also refer to:
Autonomous Province of Kosovo and Metohija, autonomous province that Serbia claims to still have under its sovereignty
Autonomous Region of Kosovo and Metohija (1945–1963), autonomous region in the People's Republic of Serbia
Autonomous Province of Kosovo and Metohija (1963–1968), autonomous province in the Socialist Republic of Serbia
Metohija (Ston), village near Ston, Croatia
, village near Podujevo, Kosovo

See also

Metohiya, a village in Bulgaria